Ducato can refer to:

the Italian word for a duchy, derived from the Latin ducatus
the former coin ducat, called after the dogal (i.e. 'ducal') state of Venice
a family name, and things named after its members, notably Danielducato after the Italian (Sardinian) amateur astronomer Daniela Ducato
 Fiat Ducato, a model of van
 Lefkada, a Greek island in the Ionian Sea also called "Ducato"

See also

Cape Ducato (disambiguation)

 Ducati (disambiguation)
 Ducat (disambiguation)